Robert Lee Smith (born July 5, 1938) is a former  American football cornerback in the National Football League (NFL). He played for the Los Angeles Rams (1962–1965) and the Detroit Lions (1965–1966). He was also a kick and punt returner.

References

1938 births
Living people
American football safeties
Detroit Lions players
Los Angeles Rams players
People from Plain Dealing, Louisiana
Players of American football from Louisiana
UCLA Bruins football players